Collinsella is a genus of Actinomycetota, in the family Coriobacteriaceae. Collinsella is named after the microbiologist Matthew D. Collins.

References

External links
https://web.archive.org/web/20051126133139/http://www.bacterio.cict.fr/c/collinsella.html

Coriobacteriaceae
Bacteria genera